Thomas Graham Jr. (born June 26, 1999) is an American football cornerback for the Cleveland Browns of the National Football League (NFL). He played college football at Oregon. He was drafted by the Chicago Bears in the sixth round of the 2021 NFL Draft.

Early life
Graham is the son of Thomas Graham Sr. and Tamisha Graham. He initially attended Roosevelt High School in Corona, California, then transferred to Rancho Cucamonga High School in Rancho Cucamonga, California. He was recruited by multiple college football programs, including Notre Dame and Nebraska, before committing to USC in July 2015. The following summer, Graham de-committed from USC. In December 2016, Graham committed to Oregon through the efforts of that program's then-head coach, Willie Taggart.

College career
As a freshman in 2017, Graham started 12 of the Ducks' 13 games, recording 49 solo tackles and three interceptions. In his 2018 sophomore season, he had 47 solo tackles and three interceptions. As a junior in 2019, he again had 47 solo tackles, along with two interceptions, one coming in the 2020 Rose Bowl. Overall at Oregon, Graham appeared in 40 games while registering 143 solo tackles, 39 assisted tackles, eight interceptions, and one forced fumble.

In September 2020, with the Pac-12 football season seemingly canceled due to the COVID-19 pandemic, Graham opted out of his senior season with Oregon and declared for the 2021 NFL Draft. In November, Graham accepted an invitation to play in the January 2021 edition of the Senior Bowl.

Professional career

Chicago Bears
Graham was drafted by the Chicago Bears in the sixth round, 228th overall, of the 2021 NFL Draft. On June 2, 2021, he signed his four-year rookie contract with Chicago. He was waived on August 31, 2021 and re-signed to the practice squad the next day. The Bears elevated Graham to their active roster after their secondary was depleted by injuries and COVID-19. Graham made his NFL debut on December 20 against the Minnesota Vikings. After playing every snap on defense with seven tackles and three pass breakups, he was signed to the active roster the next day.

On August 30, 2022, Graham was waived by the Bears and signed to the practice squad the next day.

Cleveland Browns
On September 13, 2022, Graham was signed by the Cleveland Browns off the Bears practice squad. He was waived on October 11 and re-signed to the practice squad. He was promoted back to the active roster on October 31.

References

External links

Thomas Graham, Jr. CB-Oregon: 2021 NFL Draft preview via YouTube

1999 births
Living people
American football cornerbacks
Cleveland Browns players
Chicago Bears players
Oregon Ducks football players
People from Rancho Cucamonga, California
Players of American football from California
Sportspeople from San Bernardino County, California